Gary Maxwell Watts (born 22 October 1958) is an Australian former cricketer. He played 67 first-class cricket matches for Victoria between 1977 and 1991.

Watts played twenty-six seasons of district/premier cricket for Fitzroy/Fitzroy-Doncaster between 1975/76 and 2000/01, and scored a career total of 12,933 runs at 42.26. At the end of his career, he was the highest run-scorer in premier cricket history, having surpassed the record held by John Scholes; as of 2016, he sits second behind Warren Ayres.

See also
 List of Victoria first-class cricketers

References

External links
 

1958 births
Living people
Australian cricketers
Victoria cricketers
Fitzroy cricketers